Stanley Huang (born 21 September 1974) is a Taiwanese-American singer and actor.

Early life
Huang was born and raised in Orange County, California. His family moved here before he was born. He is the brother of Jeffrey Huang and cousin of Steven Lin. His other cousin is Hollywood film producer Dan Lin.

Career
Huang started his career out in the boyband L.A. Boyz with his older brother, Jeffrey and his cousin, Steven Lin.

After leaving the band, Huang started a solo career with his debut album, Your Side, in 2000 and has made five studio albums as of 2008, and one compilation album in 2003.  Most notable are Circus Monkey (2001) and Shades of My Mind (2004).  The latter garnered him several nominations at the 16th Golden Melody Awards, Taiwan's version of the Grammys.  He ended up winning the Best Male Mandarin Artist award, beating media favorites such as Leehom Wang and Jay Chou. Over his career, Huang has collaborated with several singers, including Elva Hsiao, Rene Liu, and Jolin Tsai.  Huang has also remained active in writing and producing songs for his older brother's hip-hop band, Machi.  Huang has seldom received criticism for his music; in fact, many appreciate Huang's rock and heavy metal style. In 2006, Huang wrote and featured in Jolin Tsai song, "Nice Guy" (乖乖牌), for the 2006 album Dancing Diva, after signing to Capitol Music.

Other
Aside from music, Huang also participated in the provocative Taiwanese film, Twenty Something Taipei (台北晚9朝5), about the clubbing scene of Taipei. He has also been in featured in a 1992 video called Modern Republic (摩登共和国) when he was part of the L.A. Boyz. He has also published a book, Between Stanley, that chronicles and tells the story of being in caught in between two worlds, one of his life in LA and his roots in Taipei.

Discography

Studio albums

Compilation albums

Singles
3 December 2008: 皮在癢 (Pi Zai Yang)(Taiwanese Song)
25 August 2011: 向完美說不 (Xiang Wan Mei Shuo Bu) (Used in commercial for Mazda3 Xing Cheng)
16 March 2010: 成吉思汗 (Cheng Ji Si Han) – Genghis Khan (Theme Song for Genghis Khan Online, a Chinese MMORPG online game)
5 December 2010: 我是明星 (Wo Shi Ming Xing) – I'm a Star (Used in commercial for Casio G-Shock)
14 March 2010: Go, Go Lala Go! Theme Song
5 December 2011: 超新星 (Chao Xin Xing) – Supernova, Dear Enemy Theme Song

Photo books
2007: I Love Super! (我愛大明星：驚嘆號) with Show Lo, Jolin Tsai, and Rainie Yang.

Filmography

References

External links

Stanley Huang @ Warner Taiwan (Chinese)
Stanley Huang's blog (Chinese)

1974 births
Living people
Male actors from Los Angeles
Male actors from Taipei
Record producers from California
Musicians from Los Angeles
Musicians from Taipei
American musicians of Taiwanese descent
American people of Taiwanese descent
Taiwanese male film actors
Taiwanese male singers
Taiwanese hip hop musicians
Taiwanese Mandopop singers
Taiwanese Hokkien pop singers
Taiwanese male television actors